Howard Anthony Eastman (born 8 December 1970) is a Guyanese-British former professional boxer who competed from 1994 to 2014. He challenged twice for middleweight world championships; the vacant WBA title in 2001; and the undisputed title against Bernard Hopkins in 2005. At regional level, he held the British, Commonwealth and EBU European middleweight titles twice each between 1998 and 2007.

Early years
Having spent some time homeless, Eastman later served in the Gulf War in the Royal Fusiliers. He turned professional in March 1994 with a first-round knockout of John Rice. He garnered a reputation as a heavy puncher in the gyms of the UK, where he regularly sparred with Super Middleweights, such as Chris Eubank.  His career progressed slowly and at a low profile for many years as fellow British boxers were reluctant to face him. He accumulated an 18-0 (16 knockouts) record before challenging Steve "The Viking" Foster in November 1998 for the British Middleweight title, which he won via 7th-round knockout. In September 2000 he won the Commonwealth Middleweight title by outpointing Australian-based Egyptian (and future #1 contender) Sam Soliman, and finally began receiving wider coverage.

World title challenger
In April 2001, having put together a 31-0 (28 knockouts) record, he got a high-profile fight defending his British and Commonwealth titles and challenging for the vacant European title against Robert McCracken, who had unsuccessfully challenged Keith Holmes for the WBC world title the previous year.

Eastman dominated the fight and dropped McCracken, stopping him in the 10th round.

Following this match, U.S. promoter Don King signed him up and in November 2001 he fought two-time champ William Joppy for the vacant WBA world title on a Lennox Lewis undercard in Las Vegas. Eastman narrowly lost a controversial majority decision despite knocking Joppy down in the final seconds of the twelfth round. After this fight Eastman sat out a year in Guyana and let his contract with King expire.

Eastman resurfaced in late 2002, under the Hennessy Sports promotional outfit, and trained by former opponent McCracken. Eastman scored two knockouts, over Chardan Ansoula and Hussain Osman, respectively. He regained his European title in January 2003 against the French man Christophe Tendil, whom he stopped in five rounds with a broken jaw, and regained his British and Commonwealth titles by knocking out Scott Dann in three rounds. He defended the European title twice more, stopping ex-world champion Hacine Cherifi in eight rounds in July 2003 and outpointing Sergey Tatevoysan in January 2004.

Now with a 40-1 record and highly ranked by all sanctioning bodies, Eastman finally got the forty-year-old undisputed Middleweight king Bernard Hopkins into the ring to defend his titles, in February 2005 in Los Angeles. Eastman was outsmarted and widely outpointed by Hopkins (110-119, 111-117, 112-116) who was making his historic 20th defence. Post-fight there was initial talk of a rematch, however as the scores suggest the contest for not close enough for this to materialize.

After the world title fights
Eastman travelled to Germany in July 2005 to fight a WBA eliminator against hard hitting Armenian Arthur Abraham, Eastman lost the fight on points however claimed he had been robbed of the decision. Abraham went on to win the vacant IBF world title after the unified middleweight title was fractured after Hopkins lost to Jermain Taylor.

In March 2006, Eastman traveled to the U.S. and took on another risky eliminator, this time for the IBF title. He was stopped on his feet by the undefeated Colombian-Puerto Rican Edison Miranda. Eastman protested that he should have been allowed to continue since he had not been down in the fight.

Reclaiming his belts
On 15 December 2006, he regained his British Middleweight title by knocking out Richard Williams in the 12th and final round in London, England. Eastman was well ahead on all scorecards by the time the match ended.

In April 2007, Eastman added the Commonwealth belt to the British title with a 12-round points decision over the Kenyan Evans Ashira in Dudley. Eastman prevailed 116-113, 116-112, 116-113.

In September 2007, Eastmans revival was ended. When defending his British title against domestic fighter Wayne Elcock Eastman was surprisingly outworked and outpunched, dropping a shock points defeat by margins of 113-116, 113-115, 114-115. Elcock had previously been knocked out by Eastman-victim Scott Dann. Eastman was offered a final shot at contention, matched with John Duddy in Belfast. After a competitive 10 rounds, Eastman lost a unanimous decision.

Guyana
Eastman has continued his career in his country of birth, Guyana. He beat Denny Dalton to claim the Guyanese middleweight title, before securing victories over former WBA world welterweight champion Andrew Lewis, Leon Gilkes and Kevin Placide. In 2010 he served time in prison for possession of cannabis.

However, following the Placide fight, he went on a six-fight losing streak, losing to Kwesi Jones (September 2010, UD4), Kirt Sinnette (July 2011, TKO8, for the vacant WBC CABOFE light-heavyweight title), Edmund DeClou (October 2011, MD12, for the vacant Guyanese middleweight title), two defeats to Simeon Hardy in 2012 (UD10 and MD8) and Sakima Mullings (April 2013, UD12, for the vacant WBC CABOFE welterweight title).

Eastman ended this streak in August 2013, when he took a unanimous decision over Mark Austin over 8 rounds. In 2014, he entered the Jamaican version of the Contender series, where he was the second seed behind the aforementioned Mullings, and part of the Caribbean team. In his first fight against the Jamaican team, Eastman stopped Derrick Spencer in two rounds, his quickest win since 2003.

Professional boxing record

See also
 List of British middleweight boxing champions

References

External links

!colspan="3" style="background:#C1D8FF;"| Regional titles
|-

 

1970 births
Living people
People from New Amsterdam, Guyana
Boxers from Greater London
People from Battersea
British male boxers
Guyanese male boxers
Middleweight boxers
Guyanese emigrants to England
English people of Guyanese descent